Romeo Diaz is a Filipino music composer, record producer and music director. He was one of the members of the popular band Danny Diaz & The Checkmates in Hong Kong in the 1960s along with his two brothers, Danny Diaz and Rudy Diaz.

Biography
Romeo Diaz began his musical career in the 1960s as a member of the Hong Kong pop group “The Diaz Brothers”.
In the 1970 he started to  compose for many singers in Hong Kong and Asia. In 1983 he became the resident musical director for EMI records in Hong Kong. In 1984 he started music production company, Musicad, that won a lot of awards for advertising campaigns throughout its operation.
He has worked in close partnership with a composer and talk-show host, James Wong, and he has also collaborated with film directors such as Louis Ng, Tsui Hark, Zhang Yimou and John Woo.
He has also won film awards for his work such as “Chinese Ghost Story” and “A Terra Cotta Warrior".
He lives in Hong Kong.

Works
Music for the movie Fight and Love with a Terracotta Warrior in 1991
Music for the movie Just Heroes in 1989 with James Wong
Music for the movie A Chinese Ghost Story in 1987 with James Wong
Music for the movie Righting Wrongs in 1986

Accomplishments
Best Original Film Score for the film Fight and Love with a Terracotta Warrior at the 10th Hong Kong Film Awards
Silver place of the Best Commercial Song Awards at the RTHK Top 10 Gold Songs Awards in 1991

Personal life
Romeo Diaz has two children.

Children
 Adam Diaz is a music composer arranger. record producer, and guitarist of Hong Kong local bands.
 Krystal Diaz is a singer songwriter and a Certified Level 2 vocal coach of [Speech Level Singing] (SLS) in Hong Kong.

References

Year of birth missing (living people)
Living people
Filipino film score composers